Jaliadwip is an island of Teknaf Upazila, Chittagong District in South-Eastern Bangladesh. 

Border Guard Bangladesh recovered 80 thousand Ya ba pills, a form of methamphetamine, near Jaliadwip in February 2016. It also arrested a citizen of Myanmar with 30 thousand pieces of the drug Ya ba. It is an island on the Naf River which demarcates the border between Bangladesh and Myanmar.

References 

Upazilas of Cox's Bazar District
Islands of Bangladesh
Uninhabited islands of Bangladesh